Jason Michael Zumwalt (born September 1, 1975) is an American actor, voice actor, comedian and scriptwriter, best known for his voice role as Roman Bellic in the video game Grand Theft Auto IV and Episodes from Liberty City.

Career
Zumwalt began his acting career in 2004, playing a small role in the short film 16w. From then until 2008 he took small roles in low-budget films, television series and video game roles to make a living.

In 2008 Zumwalt was hired by Rockstar Games as a voice actor in their video game Grand Theft Auto IV, playing the role of protagonist Niko Bellic's cousin Roman. Upon release, Zumwalt's character was critically well-received due to his distinctive accent and humorous dialogue. To this day, Grand Theft Auto IV is still his most notable role.

In 2014 Zumwalt co-wrote the script for the dramatic thriller Urge, alongside Aaron Kaufman. He also co-wrote the screenplay for the 2016 independent film Flock of Dudes, alongside Bob Castrone and Brian Levin.

He is now the 'Voice of God' at the beginning of the award winning Around the NFL podcast, having taken over the role from Matt 'Money' Smith

Filmography

References

External links
 

1975 births
Living people
American male film actors
American male television actors
American male voice actors
American male video game actors
American male screenwriters
21st-century American male actors
American male comedians
People from Kingman, Arizona
Male actors from Arizona
Screenwriters from Arizona
21st-century American comedians
21st-century American screenwriters
21st-century American male writers